Jason Smith may refer to:

Sports
Jason Smith (American football) (born 1986), American football player
Jason Smith (Australian rules footballer) (born 1972), former Australian rules footballer
Jason Smith (basketball, born 1974) (born 1974), Australian basketball player
Jason Smith (basketball, born 1986), American basketball player
Jason Smith (baseball) (born 1977), baseball player
Jason Smith (boxer) (born 1973), Canadian boxer
Jason Smith (cricketer) (born 1994), South African cricketer
Jason Smith (curler) (born 1983), American curler
Jason Smith (English footballer) (born 1974), English footballer
Jason Smith (ice hockey) (born 1973), Canadian ice hockey defenceman
Jason Smith (rugby league) (born 1972), Australian rugby league footballer
Jason Smith (snowboarder) (born 1982), Olympic athlete
Jason Smith (soccer), American soccer coach and former player
Jason Smith (snooker player) (born 1964), English snooker player

Entertainers
Jason Smith (actor) (born 1984), Australian actor and singer
Jason Smith (chef), American chef
Jason Smith (visual effects), American visual effects artist
Jason Matthew Smith (born 1972), American film and television actor
Jason Samuels Smith (born 1980), American tap dance performer, choreographer, and director
Jason Smith (born 1970), American sports radio host of AllNight with Jason Smith

Other
Jason Smith (American politician) (born 1980), member of the United States House of Representatives for Missouri
Jason Smith (New Zealand politician), mayor of Kaipara 
Jason "Singer" Smith, American rock climber
Jason Martin-Smith (1972–2001), English murder victim

See also
AllNight with Jason Smith, a former syndicated sports talk radio show on ESPN Radio
Jay Smith (disambiguation)
Jason Smyth (born 1987), Irish sprinter
Jason Weir-Smith (born 1975), former tennis player from South Africa